Marvin Tile  (born 11 January 1933) is an orthopedic surgeon, former Chief of Surgery at Sunnybrook Health Sciences Centre, and University of Toronto professor, who was made a Member of the Order of Canada in 2009. Tile is co-founder of Sunnybrook Hospital Trauma Unit  and founding president of the Ontario Orthopedic Association   Born in Toronto, Ontario, Tile attended Harbord Collegiate Institute and the University of Toronto where he earned a B.Sc. (Med) and MD degrees in 1957. He received his FRCS(C) in 1963 after which he studied in Europe as a Detweiler Traveling Fellow   Tile has written two books and 59 manuscripts "pioneering the practice of orthopedics around the world"

Books

 Fractures of the Pelvis and Acetabulum, 2nd edition, Marvin Tile, published by Williams & Wilkins (1984) .
 The Rationale of Operative Fracture Care, 3rd edition, Schatzker J and Tile, M, .

References

External links

1933 births
Members of the Order of Canada
University of Toronto alumni
Living people
Canadian orthopedic surgeons